Siawi, also known as Musan, is one of two Amto–Musan (Samaia River) languages. It is spoken in Siawi village, Green River Rural LLG, Sandaun Province, Papua New Guinea.

The name "Siawi" is misspelling of the endonym, Siafli, used on government maps. The old name for the language, "Musan", is a clan name.

Notes 

Languages of Sandaun Province
Amto–Musan languages